Prionoptera is a genus of moths of the family Noctuidae.

Species
Prionoptera aexonia (Druce, 1890)
Prionoptera serra (Herrich-Schäffer, 1856)
Prionoptera serraoides Dognin, 1892
Prionoptera socorrensis Dognin, 1912

References
Butterflies and Moths of the World: Generic Names and their Type-species

Catocalinae